The 1983 Astro-Bluebonnet Bowl was a college football postseason bowl game that featured the Baylor Bears and the Oklahoma State Cowboys.

Background
Oklahoma State finished 4th in the Big Eight Conference in their second bowl appearance in three seasons. Baylor finished tied for 3rd in the Southwest Conference in their first bowl game since 1981.

Game summary
For Baylor, Gerald McNeil caught 10 passes for 163 yards with 2 touchdowns. Oklahoma State quarterback Rusty Hilger went 12-of-17 for 137 yards and two touchdowns before being knocked out by Robert Watters, missing the 2nd half.

Scoring summary
 Oklahoma State – Lewis 12 pass from Rusty Hilger (kick blocked), 8:45 remaining in 1st
 Oklahoma State – Anderson 1 run (Lewis pass from Hilger), 14:58 remaining in 2nd
 Oklahoma State – Harris 26 pass from Rusty Hilger (Roach kick), 6:02 remaining in 2nd
 Baylor – Gerald McNeil 12 pass from Cody Carlson (Jimmerson kick), 1:21 remaining in 2nd
 Oklahoma State – Larry Roach 44 yard field goal, 0:16, remaining in 2nd
 Baylor – Gerald McNeil 28 pass from Alfred Anderson (Jimmerson kick), 5:07 remaining in 4th

Aftermath
Johnson left for the Miami Hurricanes after the game ended.  Baylor returned to the penultimate Bluebonnet Bowl in 1986. Both would become conference rivals starting in 1996 with advent of the Big XII.

Statistics

References

Astro-Bluebonnet Bowl
Bluebonnet Bowl
Baylor Bears football bowl games
Oklahoma State Cowboys football bowl games
December 1983 sports events in the United States
1983 in sports in Texas
1983 in Houston